Sigmund Løvåsen (born 16 August 1977) is a Norwegian novelist and playwright.

Career
Løvåsen was born in Trysil. He made his literary début in 2003 with the novel , for which he was awarded the Tarjei Vesaas' debutantpris. In 2006 he published the novel , and in 2009 the novel Mamselle Iversen. His plays include Daga from 2004, Vente på fugl (2009) and Vid din sida (2011). In 2020 he issued a biography of Kjell Aukrust.

He was leader of the Norwegian Authors' Union from 2012 to 2017.

References

1977 births
Living people
People from Trysil
21st-century Norwegian novelists
Norwegian male novelists
Norwegian dramatists and playwrights